Georges Lagrange (23 November 1929 – 11 December 2014) was a Roman Catholic bishop.

Ordained to the priesthood on 29 June 1955, Lagrange was appointed bishop of the Roman Catholic Diocese of Gap on 11 July 1988 and was ordained bishop on 18 September 1988. Lagrange resigned on 18 November 2003.

Notes

1929 births
2014 deaths
Bishops of Gap